Auth or AUTH may refer to:

People with the surname
 Ferdinand Auth (1914–1995), German politician 
 Robert Auth (born 1956), American politician 
 Tony Auth (1942–2014), cartoonist

Other uses
 Authentication, and authorization in computer security
 Ident, an Internet protocol
 SMTP-AUTH
 Aristotle University of Thessaloniki